The following is a complete list of Oswald the Lucky Rabbit's appearances in cartoons, films, video games, etc.

Filmography

Oswald the Lucky Rabbit/Oswald Rabbit series 
This list contains cartoons that were part of Universal Pictures' Oswald the Lucky Rabbit/Oswald Rabbit theatrical cartoon series. Winkler Pictures and Walt Disney produced the first 27 cartoons (1927–1928), an additional 25 cartoons were produced by Winkler after Disney's departure (1928–1929), and the rest were produced by Walter Lantz.

1927

1928

1929

1930

1931

1932

1933

1934

1935

1936

1937

1938

Online shorts

Other films and shorts

Video games

Television

References

Bibliography 
 

Film series introduced in 1927
Oswald the Lucky Rabbit shorts
Lists of animated films by character
Lost American films
Oswald the Lucky Rabbit cartoons
Walter Lantz Productions shorts
Wikipedia articles in need of updating from August 2017